Jeyhun Abiyev (born October 24, 1974 in Baku) is a retired male light flyweight boxer from Azerbaijan.

Abiyev competed for his native country at the 2004 Summer Olympics in Athens, Greece, where he was stopped in the second round of the men's light flyweight division (– 48 kg) by Turkey's eventual silver medalist Atagün Yalçınkaya. He qualified for the Athens Games by ending up in first place at the 4th AIBA European 2004 Olympic Qualifying Tournament in Baku, Azerbaijan.

References
sports-reference

1974 births
Living people
Azerbaijani male boxers
Flyweight boxers
Boxers at the 2004 Summer Olympics
Olympic boxers of Azerbaijan
Sportspeople from Baku